Tsarkva is a village in Balchik Municipality, Dobrich Province, northeastern Bulgaria.

References

Villages in Dobrich Province